Pyeongchon Station is a station on the Seoul Subway Line 4. It is located in the downtown of Anyang city. Courthouse and Office of Education are near the station. The station has recently installed escalators and new exits. It is also connected to E-mart.

Station layout

References

Metro stations in Anyang, Gyeonggi
Seoul Metropolitan Subway stations
Railway stations opened in 1993